Butterfish may refer to:

 Stromateidae, found in coastal waters off the Americas, western Africa and in the Indo-Pacific
 Sablefish (Anoplopoma fimbria), found in muddy sea beds in the North Pacific Ocean
 Rock gunnel (Pholis gunnellus), ray-finned fish, found in the coastal waters of the North Atlantic Ocean and in the Atlantic part of the Arctic Ocean
 Pacific rudderfish (Psenopsis anomala), also as Japanese butterfish and simply butterfish, found in the Western Pacific, near Japan, in the Taiwan Strait and in the East China Sea
 Pentapodus nagasakiensis, also known as Japanese butterfish or Japanese whiptail, found in the Western Pacific.
 Escolar is sometimes fraudulently labelled as butterfish.

See also
Butter catfish (disambiguation)